The Soviet Union's 1974 nuclear test series was a group of 21 nuclear tests conducted in 1974. These tests  followed the 1973 Soviet nuclear tests series and preceded the 1975 Soviet nuclear tests series.

References

1974
1974 in the Soviet Union
1974 in military history
Explosions in 1974